The Webley–Fosbery Self-Cocking Automatic Revolver is a recoil-operated automatic revolver designed by Lieutenant Colonel George Vincent Fosbery VC and produced by the Webley & Scott company from 1901 to 1924. The revolver is easily recognisable by the zig-zag grooves on the cylinder.

History
Semi-automatic pistols were just beginning to appear when Colonel Fosbery (1832–1907) devised a revolver that cocked the hammer and rotated the cylinder by sliding the action, cylinder and barrel assembly back on the frame. The prototype was a modified Colt Single Action Army revolver. Fosbery patented his invention 16 August 1895 and further improvements were patented in June and October 1896.

Fosbery took his design to P. Webley & Son of Birmingham. P. Webley & Son, which merged with W.C. Scott & Sons and Richard Ellis & Son in 1897 to form the Webley & Scott Revolver and Arms Co., was the primary manufacturer of service pistols for the British Army as well as producing firearms for civilian use. Webley further developed the design and the Webley–Fosbery Automatic Revolver was introduced at the matches at Bisley of July 1900.

In civilian use, the Webley–Fosbery was popular with target-shooters. Because the trigger mechanism did not rotate the cylinder, shots were smooth and consistent, permitting rapid and accurate shooting. Walter Winans, a famous contemporary target shooter, preferred the Webley–Fosbery, and in 1902 he used it to place six shots in a  bull's-eye at 12 paces in seven seconds. Using a Prideaux speedloader he was able to fire twelve shots into a  bull's-eye in approximately 15 seconds.

Wartime usage
Though Webley viewed this weapon as an ideal sidearm for cavalry troops, the Webley–Fosbery was never adopted as an official government sidearm. Several models of Webley–Fosbery revolvers were produced, and the type saw limited action in the Boer Wars as well as World War I, where some privately purchased examples were carried by British officers in the .455 service chambering. Reports from the field suggested that the Webley–Fosbery, with its precisely machined recoil surfaces, was more susceptible to jamming in wartime conditions of mud and rain than comparable sidearms of the period. It has been commonly alleged that the Webley–Fosbery required a tight hold in order for the cylinder to properly cycle and cock the weapon. 

Production ceased in 1924, with a total production of less than 5,000. Many revolvers remained unsold, and the model was carried in Webley's catalogues as late as 1939.

References

Bibliography
 Dowell, William Chipcase, The Webley Story, (Commonwealth Heritage Foundation, Kirkland, Washington:  1987)

External links
Video of a Webley–Fosbery, showing self-cocking action
Behold the Webley-Fosbery
Webley Fosbery Automatic Revolver Caliber .455(UK)
Webley Fosbery Automatic Revolver Model 1900

.38 ACP firearms
Automatic revolvers
Early revolvers
Military revolvers
Revolvers of the United Kingdom
Short recoil firearms
Weapons and ammunition introduced in 1901